Monte Ferrante (2,409 m) is a mountain of Lombardy, Italy. It is located within the Bergamo Alps and lies between the comunes of Vilminore di Scalve and Oltressenda Alta.

References

Mountains of the Alps
Mountains of Lombardy